Hexaaza-18-crown-6 is the macrocyclic ligand with the formula (CH2CH2NH)6. A white solid, this compound has attracted attention as the N6-analogue of 18-crown-6. It functions as a hexadentate ligand in coordination chemistry. It is the parent hexaaza-crown ether.

Its protonated derivatives bind anions via multiple hydrogen bonds.

References

Polyamines
Ethyleneamines
Chelating agents
Macrocycles
Hexadentate ligands